KOPX-TV (channel 62) is a television station in Oklahoma City, Oklahoma, United States, affiliated with Ion Television. Owned by Inyo Broadcast Holdings, the station maintains offices on Railway Drive in north Oklahoma City, and its transmitter is located near 122nd Street on the city's northeast side.

History
The station first signed on the air on March 16, 1996, as KMNZ; it originally operated as an affiliate of InTV, a network operated by Paxson Communications that specialized in paid programming. On August 31, 1998, KOPX became a charter station of the family-oriented Pax TV network (later formatted as a general entertainment service as i: Independent Television, now Ion Television), with programming from Christian television network The Worship Network airing during the overnight hours.

Newscasts
In November 2002, in relation to agreements between Pax TV and several major network affiliates (most of which were affiliated with NBC, which held a minority interest in Pax), KOPX began airing tape delayed rebroadcasts of morning and late evening newscasts from NBC affiliate KFOR-TV (channel 4). The 6 a.m. hour of the morning newscast aired on a one-hour tape delay (at 7 a.m.), while the 10 p.m. newscast aired on a half-hour delay (at 10:30 p.m.), with the latter beginning shortly before the live 10 p.m. newscast on KFOR-TV ended. The news share agreement ended on June 30, 2005 (coinciding with Pax's rebranding as i: Independent Television), due to Paxson Communications' decision to discontinue carriage of network affiliate newscasts as a result of Pax's financial troubles.

Technical information

Subchannels
The station's digital signal is multiplexed:

Analog-to-digital conversion
KOPX-TV began transmitting a digital television signal on UHF channel 50 on November 1, 2002. The station discontinued regular programming on its analog signal, over UHF channel 62, on June 12, 2009, as part of the federally mandated transition from analog to digital television. The station's digital signal remained on its pre-transition UHF channel 50, using PSIP to display KOPX-TV's virtual channel as 62 on digital television receivers, which was among the high band UHF channels (52-69) that were removed from broadcasting use as a result of the transition.

As a part of the repacking process following the 2016–2017 FCC incentive auction, KOPX-TV relocated to UHF channel 18 in 2019, using PSIP to display its virtual channel number as 62.

References

External links
Ion Television official website

Ion Television affiliates
Bounce TV affiliates
Court TV affiliates
Grit (TV network) affiliates
Defy TV affiliates
TrueReal affiliates
Television channels and stations established in 1996
1996 establishments in Oklahoma
OPX-TV